Costa Rica elects on national level a head of state, the president, and a legislature. The President of Costa Rica is, together with two vice-presidents, elected for a four-year term by the people. The Legislative Assembly (Asamblea Legislativa) has 57 members, elected for four-year terms by closed list proportional representation in each of the country's seven provinces.

Schedule

Election

Inauguration

2010 elections

2014 elections

2018 elections

2022 elections

See also
 List of political parties in Costa Rica

External links
 Costa Rica Adam Carr
 Eleccionescr Neutral Site of Political Information